Tris(acetylacetonato)titanium(III), often abbreviated Ti(acac)3, is a coordination complex of titanium(III) featuring acetylacetonate (acac) ligands, making it one of a family of metal acetylacetonates.  It is a blue air-sensitive solid that dissolves in nonpolar organic solvents.  The compound is prepared by treating titanium trichloride with acetylacetone in the presence of base. Being paramagnetic, it gives a contact-shifted proton NMR signal at 60 ppm upfield of TMS assigned to the methyl group.

Structure
It is an octahedral complex. The Ti-O bonds lengths range from 2.023 to 2.013 Å, the large variation being attributed to the Jahn-Teller effect. Ti(acac)3 possesses helical chirality, giving rise to Δ- and Λ-enantiomers. 

It is a precatalyst for Ziegler-Natta catalysis.

References

Acetylacetonate complexes